St. Mark's Church (Danish: Sankt Markus Kirke) is a church at the end of Julius Thomsens Plads in the Frederiksberg district of Copenhagen, Denmark.

History

The church was built from 1900 to 1902 to the design of Carl Lendorf. It was consecrated on 9 November 1902 at a ceremony attended by Bishop Kultus Minister J. C. Christensen.

The area was still quite undeveloped on its completion but the surrounding buildings were built from  1903 to 1904 according to a symmetrical plan by Andreas Clemmensen.

Architecture
The church is a cruciform church built in red brick with inspiration from Byzantine and Romanesque architecture.

Over the main portal there is a mosaic by Oscar Willerup depicting Saint Mark the Evangelist with a quill and a winged lion, his symbol.

In popular culture
The church is used as a location in the 2003 comedy Se til venstre, der er en svensker.

See also
 Brorson's Church

References

External links
 Official website

Lutheran churches in Copenhagen
20th-century Church of Denmark churches
Churches completed in 1902
Churches in the Diocese of Copenhagen